Lieutenant-General Sir George Charles Gordon-Lennox  (29 May 1908 – 11 May 1988) was a senior British Army officer who served during the Second World War.

Military career
Gordon-Lennox was the eldest child of Lord Bernard Gordon-Lennox and a grandson of the 7th Duke of Richmond. His mother was Evelyn, daughter of Henry Loch, 1st Baron Loch. He was educated at Eton and was a Page of Honour to George V from 1921 to 1924.

After Eton, he trained at Sandhurst and was commissioned into the Grenadier Guards in 1928.

He fought with the Grenadier Guards in the Second World War, in which he was wounded, awarded the DSO and mentioned in despatches.

In 1951 Gordon-Lennox was appointed Commanding Officer of the Grenadier Guards and in 1952 he was awarded the CVO. In 1952 he also became Commander of 1st Guards Brigade. He went on to be General Officer Commanding 3rd Division in 1959. In 1960 he became Commandant of the Royal Military Academy Sandhurst and then Director-General of Military Training at the War Office in 1963. A year later, he was knighted and transferred to Scotland where he was General Officer Commanding-in-Chief of the Scottish Command and Governor of Edinburgh Castle until 1966.

In 1965, he became Colonel of the Gordon Highlanders and his last post was in retirement, as King of Arms of the Order of the British Empire from 1968 until 1983.

Family
He married Nancy Brenda Darell and they went on together to have two sons (the eldest was Major-General Bernard Gordon Lennox).

References

|-

|-

|-
 

British Army lieutenant generals
Grenadier Guards officers
British Army personnel of World War II
Commandants of Sandhurst
Knights Commander of the Order of the British Empire
Commanders of the Royal Victorian Order
Companions of the Order of the Bath
Companions of the Distinguished Service Order
Pages of Honour
1908 births
1988 deaths
Graduates of the Royal Military College, Sandhurst
People educated at Eton College